Lancaster County House of Employment, also known as Old County Hospital Building No. 1, is a historic building located at Lancaster Township, Lancaster County, Pennsylvania. It was built in 1799–1801, and is a two-story, 15 bay wide stuccoed stone building.  It has a full width front porch with Tuscan order columns, added about 1875–1876. The same renovation added Gothic Revival style details. It has been in continuous ownership by Lancaster County since its construction.  It was built as a poor house and used as the House of Employment until 1876, when it was converted to a hospital.  It later housed county offices.

It was listed on the National Register of Historic Places in 1980.

References

Further reading

, Masters Thesis

Government buildings on the National Register of Historic Places in Pennsylvania
Gothic Revival architecture in Pennsylvania
Government buildings completed in 1801
Buildings and structures in Lancaster County, Pennsylvania
Residential buildings on the National Register of Historic Places in Pennsylvania
National Register of Historic Places in Lancaster County, Pennsylvania